Valtter Laaksonen (born 3 May 1984) is a Finnish footballer currently playing for Finnish Veikkausliiga club VPS.

References
  Interin luottomies Laaksonen siirtyy Norjaan
  Veikkausliiga Hall of Fame
  veikkausliiga.com Profile

1984 births
Living people
Finnish footballers
Vaasan Palloseura players
FC Inter Turku players
Veikkausliiga players
Finnish expatriate footballers
Expatriate footballers in Norway
Sogndal Fotball players
Association football forwards
Footballers from Turku